Florinel Constantin Sandu (born 23 January 2001) is a Romanian professional footballer who plays as a midfielder for Flacăra Horezu.

References

External links
 
 

2001 births
Living people
Footballers from Bucharest
Romanian footballers
Association football midfielders
Liga I players
LPS HD Clinceni players
Liga II players
CS Concordia Chiajna players
Liga III players